The archeological complex of Preah Khan of Kampong Svay or Prasat Bakan (according to local pronunciation) or Bakan Svay Rolay is located 100 km east of Angkor, in Preah Vihear province, Cambodia. It stands as the largest single religious complex ever built during Angkorian Era, as its exterior enclosure is over 22 km square, even if the isolated location makes it one of the less-visited Angkorian sites.

History 
There is little historical data about Preah Khan of Kompong Svay. French scholars argued it had been founded in the 11th century, probably by Suryavarman I. Evidence from sediment analysis suggests that the site was fully abandoned during the late 14th to 15th century, with maintenance to temples and infrastructure ceasing around the mid-14th century. It is notable for its use as a royal residence during the kingdom of Suryavarman II, and served as a military outpost for Jayavarman VII during conflicts with the Cham in the late 12th century.

Some of the theories listed by Mitch Hendrickson & Damian Evans about what Preah Khan Kompong Svay actually was include a kingdom of Khmer, its own entity, a trading outpost, and a defensive center. The site was most likely used for religious purposes until the post Bayon period, which is supported by sandstone dating to the main Bayon period accompanied by face decorations common in the main Bayon period. As well as studying the sandstone itself, also examined are the architectural styles and cultural influences of Fire Shrines (dated to the late 12th century, 25 total Fire Shrines in Southeast Asia) and “Temple d’étape”s (dated to the early 12th century, interesting to note that these temples are ONLY found on the East royal road leading to Preah Khan Kompong Svay as well as other sites), as well as other larger temples, all constructed mainly with sandstone, that were built roughly every 15 km along the road.

The rediscovery of the complex
In 1873, the explorer Louis Delaporte visited the complex, studied its ruins while the monument was already damaged. With the agreement of the King of Cambodia, he sent to France examples of reliefs and stone scupture that were exhibited in the Indochinese Museum of the Trocadéro before being transfered to the collections of the musée Guimet in 1927.  After some French missions at the turn of the 19th century, Victor Goloubew in 1937 engaged in aerial surveys which revealed the true extent of the complex.

Many famous Khmer sculptures come from here, such as the putative head of Jayavarman VII which is displayed at the National Museum of Phnom Penh. The sculptures and carvings of Preah Khan are among the peak works of Khmer art, and the temples have been widely sacked in the past. Thieves have also damaged many structures while looting sculptures and carvings during the second half of the 1990s.

The site
Preah Khan of Kompong Svay covers an area about 22.5 kilometers square and has four concentric enclosures. Unusually for Khmer sites (which are typically oriented eastward), the temple complex is aligned to the northeast. It was provided with water by a large baray (2.8 km by 750 m but almost completely dried at present), which crosses the eastern side. On an artificial island (mebon) in the middle of the baray there is Preah Thkol, a cruciform temple in sandstone with a standing central tower. In the southeastern corner stands the remains of the 15 meter high pyramid of Preah Damrei, with laterite enclosure and two stone elephants (Damrei means elephant) at its upper corners. The other two elephants are exhibited at the National Museum of Phnom Penh and Guimet Museum in Paris.

Inside the exterior enclosure, in the middle of the western side of baray, there is Prasat Preah Stung, with a peculiar four-faced central tower in Bayon style. This is preceded by a landing-stage with nāga balustrades. A laterite causeway leads from here to a centric enclosure, 701 m by 1097 m, surrounded by a moat and endowed with four gopuras similar to Angkor Thom. Near the eastern gopura there is a dharmasala.

The inner laterite enclosure contains the central sanctuary, standing on a two-tier platform. The central tower collapsed because of a looting attempt in 2003. It has entrances in all cardinal directions and is rounded by a windowed gallery.

Revised mapping of the area using various methods such as ASTER Imagery, OrbView Imagery, FINNMAP photographs, etc. shows extensive hydraulic structures, masonry religious structures, and concentrations of stoneware, earthware, imported porcelain, and various ceramics which point to 11th-17th century occupation of the area.

Iron production 
Due to its close proximity to iron resources, notably Phnom Dek (the "iron mountain"), the production of iron was thought to be central to Preah Khan's importance. Unlike other Angkorian sites, evidence for iron smelting was even found near temples and within the walled enclosures. However, analysis of slag from these locations showed that production likely started in the mid-13th century, well after the complex was fully completed, and continued in the periods coinciding with the decline of the Khmer empire. Sediment analysis from the main baray supports a similar timeline; evidence of widespread burning at the site, possibly for industrial purposes, appears in the mid-14th century, with little evidence for regular burning at the site before that point. This sudden change in use could show a departure of the Khmer, with the complex being repurposed by local groups.

The iron production techniques of the Kuay people, indigenous to the region, suggest a possible association with the Khmer iron produced in and around Preah Khan. Slag analysis from local furnaces, used until the mid- 20th century, and furnaces contemporary to Preah Khan both used similar smelting recipes; as well as this, both used bamboo for shaping and framing techniques in the construction of their furnaces. However, the two groups were shown to use different sources for their ore. This continuity might show the Kuay's historical involvement in producing iron for the Khmer.

World Heritage Status 
This site was added to the UNESCO World Heritage Tentative List on March 27, 2020 (originally proclaimed September 1, 1992) in the Cultural category.

Notes

Bibliography

 - Download

External links 

Andy Brouwer's blog
PeaceOfAngkor
Preah Khan Kompong Svay on CISARK website
Preah Thkol on CISARK website
Preah Damrei on CISARK website
Prasat Preah Stung on CISARK website
Industries of Angkor Project
Preah Khan of Kampong Svay - by Digital Culture

Asian archaeology
Archaeological sites in Cambodia
Buildings and structures in Preah Vihear province
Angkorian sites in Preah Vihear Province